Adolfo Ferreira Caminha (May 29, 1867 – January 1, 1897) was a Brazilian Naturalist novelist, famous for his polemical novel Bom-Crioulo, which deals with race and homosexuality.

Life
Caminha was born in Aracati in 1867, to Raimundo Ferreira dos Santos and Maria Firmina Caminha. Orphaned when he was 10 years old, he went to live with his uncle in Fortaleza. In 1883, he moved to Rio de Janeiro, where another relative of his matriculated him in a naval school. In 1886, he published his first book: Voos Incertos (Uncertain Flights). In the same year, he made an instruction trip to the United States.

In 1887 he was promoted to Second Lieutenant and published the short story books Judite and Lágrimas de um Crente (Tears of a Believer). In 1888 he returned to Fortaleza, but got involved on a scandal where he eloped with an alférezs daughter. They had two daughters, and fled to Rio de Janeiro, where Caminha spent his life as a civil servant.

By 1891,
Caminha was working on journals such as the Jornal do Commercio, Gazeta de Notícias and O País, using the pseudonym Félix Guanabarino. He also published the novel A Normalista. In 1894, he published an account of his travel to the U.S.A., entitled No País dos Ianques (In the Country of the Yankees). In 1895, he published his controversial novel Bom-Crioulo and Cartas Literárias. In 1896, he founded a journal named Nova Revista, and published the novel Tentação.

Poor and debilitated by tuberculosis, he died at only 29 years old, leaving unfinished two novels.

Works

Poetry
 Voos Incertos (1886)

Short stories
 Judite (1887)
 Lágrimas de um Crente (1887)

Novels
 A Normalista (1891)
 Bom-Crioulo (1895)
 Cartas Literárias (1895)
 Tentação (1896)

Other
 No País dos Ianques (1894)

Unfinished works
 Ângelo
 O Emigrado

Further reading
 BRAGA-PINTO, César. Othello's Pathologies: reading Caminha with Lombroso. Comparative Literature 66 (1). Spring, 2014. 149-171.

External links

 Caminha's biography 
 
 

1867 births
1897 deaths
19th-century Brazilian poets
19th-century Brazilian novelists
Brazilian male novelists
Brazilian male short story writers
Brazilian memoirists
Brazilian journalists
People from Ceará
19th-century deaths from tuberculosis
Portuguese-language writers
19th-century journalists
Male journalists
Brazilian male poets
19th-century Brazilian short story writers
19th-century Brazilian male writers
19th-century memoirists
Tuberculosis deaths in Rio de Janeiro (state)